is a passenger railway station located in the city of Amagasaki Hyōgo Prefecture, Japan. It is operated by the private transportation company Hankyu Railway.

Lines

Layout
The station consists of one ground-level island platform and one side platform. One side of the island platform (for track 3) is short, and is used by the Itami Line. The platforms are connected by an underground passage.

Platforms

History 
The station opened on 1 April 1936.

Station numbering was introduced on 21 December 2013, with Tsukaguchi being designated as station number HK-06.

Passenger statistics
In fiscal 2019, the station was used by an average of 45,645 passengers daily

Surrounding area
Tsukaguchi Sun Sun Town shopping center
Sonoda Women's University
Sonoda Gakuen Junior and Senior High School
Amagasaki City Fire Department

See also
List of railway stations in Japan

References

External links
 Station website 
 Tsukaguchi Sun Sun Town 

Railway stations in Japan opened in 1920
Railway stations in Hyōgo Prefecture
Hankyū Kōbe Main Line
Amagasaki